Chlap is a 2022 Czech television series. It starrs Tomáš Maštalír, Jitka Ježková, Andrea Růžičková, Jiří Dvořák, Ivan Lupták and Eva Leinweberová. It premiered on March 10, 2022. It is an adaptation of the Italian series Doc – Nelle tue mani from 2020 broadcast on TV Rai 1.

Cast and characters 
 Tomáš Maštalír as doc. MUDr. Ondřej Frank
 Jitka Ježková as MUDr. Hana Franková
 Andrea Růžičková as MUDr. Eva Ulmanová
 Ivan Lupták as MUDr. Adam Štraus
 Jiří Dvořák as MUDr. Marek Sýkora
 Jenovéfa Boková as MUDr. Tereza Černá
 Valer Mbila as MUDr. Gabriel Kidane
 Jan Nedbal as MUDr. Filip Coufal
 Elizaveta Maximová as MUDr. Linda Myšičková
 Robert Hájek as MUDr. Michal Kovář
 Eva Leinweberová as Mgr. Lenka Trčková
 Martin Myšička as MUDr. Karel Drtina
 Stanislava Jachnická as MUDr. Marta Gráblová
 Pavel Batěk as Tomáš Dobrovolský

References

External links 
 Official page
 

TV Nova (Czech TV channel) original programming
Czech drama television series
Czech medical television series
Czech television series based on non-Czech television series
2022 Czech television series debuts